The New York Business Corporation Law is the primary corporation statute in the State of New York. It is an influential model in U.S. corporate law. It is chapter 4 of the Consolidated Laws of New York, originally enacted as chapter 567 of the Laws of 1890.

See also
United States corporate law
Delaware General Corporation Law
UK company law

Notes

References

External links
New York Business Corporation Law (NYBCL)

United States corporate law
New York (state) law